Leslie Eugene "Gene" Hartley (January 28, 1926 – March 13, 1993) was an American racecar driver. He was born and died in Roanoke, Indiana.

Hartley was the son of midget car driver Ted Hartley, who competed into his 60s. "Auto racing is all I’ve ever known," Gene once said in an interview at the Indianapolis Motor Speedway.

Racing career
He drove in the AAA and USAC Championship Car series, racing in the 1950 and 1952–1962 seasons with 33 starts. He raced in ten Indianapolis 500 races, in each year but 1955 and 1958. His best finish at Indy was tenth in 1957, although he finished eleventh three times. He finished in the Top 10 nine times, with his best finish in second position in 1956 at Langhorne Speedway.

Hartley was the 1959 USAC National Midget Series champion. His 33 USAC feature wins were eighth best all-time.

Promoter
Hartley co-promoted with Leroy Warriner at the Kitley Avenue Speedrome in Indianapolis after his retirement. They hosted midget races at the track that was specifically built for the small cars.

Career award
Hartley was inducted in the National Midget Auto Racing Hall of Fame in 1985.

Indy 500 results

World Championship career summary
The Indianapolis 500 was part of the FIA World Championship from 1950 through 1960. Drivers competing at Indy during those years were credited with World Championship points and participation. Gene Hartley entered 10 World Championship races and started 8 of them, with a best finish of tenth.

References

1926 births
1993 deaths
Indianapolis 500 drivers
People from Huntington County, Indiana
Racing drivers from Indiana